Mukhtar Museum is a museum in Cairo, Egypt, housing the sculptures of Mahmoud Mokhtar (May 10, 1891 – March 28, 1934). Mokhtar is considered to be significant as the father of modern Egyptian sculpture. His tomb is in the basement of the museum.

The museum building was designed by Ramses Wissa Wassef, and houses eighty-five bronze, stone, basalt, marble, granite and plaster works.

The museum has two floors with eight rooms of exhibits. One room is dedicated to Saad Zaghloul.

References

External links

Mahmoud mokhtar museum on Finearts sector  
Mahmoud mokhtar full biography

Museums in Cairo
Art museums and galleries in Egypt
Arab art scene